Daghlan (also Romanized as Dāghlān, Daglan, and Dāqlān) is a village in Qaqazan-e Sharqi Rural District, in the Central District of Takestan County, Qazvin Province, Iran. At the 2006 census, its population was 1,224, in 290 families. This village is populated by Azerbaijani Turks.

References 

Populated places in Takestan County